Rene Aas (born 13 August 1969) is an Estonian motorcycle racer.

He was born in Tallinn.

He began his motorcycle racing career in 1981, coached by Vambola Helm. He won silver medal at 1990 Speedway Under-21 World Championship. He is 3-times Estonian champion in different motorsport disciplines. In 1993 he moved to Great Britain. He is the first Estonian speedway racer who is competed for British teams.

References

Living people
1969 births
Estonian motorcycle racers
Sportspeople from Tallinn